Gliese 3470 b, abbreviated as GJ 3470b, is an exoplanet orbiting the star Gliese 3470, located in the constellation Cancer. With a mass of just under 14 Earth-masses and a radius approximately 4.3 times that of Earth's, it is likely something akin to a mini-Neptune despite the initially strong belief that the planet was not covered in clouds like the gas giants in the Solar System.

The orbit of Gliese 3470 b is strongly inclined to the equatorial plane of the parent star, with misalignment equal to 97°.

In August 2022, this planet and its host star were included among 20 systems to be named by the third NameExoWorlds project.

Atmosphere 
The atmosphere of Gliese 3470 b is one of the best spectroscopically characterized among all exoplanets.

The exoplanet's atmosphere was first observed by researchers Akihiko Fukui, Norio Narita and Kenji Kuroda at the University of Tokyo in 2013, and afterwards, Fukui commented, "Suppose the atmosphere consists of hydrogen and helium, the mass of the atmosphere would be 5–20% of the total mass of the planet. Comparing that to the fact that the mass of Earth's atmosphere is about one ten-thousandth of a percent (0.0001%) of the total mass of the Earth, this planet has a considerably thick atmosphere." In 2013, by means of Large Binocular Telescope observations, with the LBC Blue and Red cameras, a team reported the detection of Rayleigh scattering in the atmosphere of this planet. In 2015 a team using the Las Cumbres Observatory Global Telescope (LCOGT) network confirmed this finding. In the Las Cumbres researchers' paper published in The Astrophysical Journal, they conclude that the most plausible explanation for the scattering effect to be an atmosphere made predominantly of hydrogen and helium, causing the exoplanet to be veiled by dense clouds and hazes. It is thought that the planet would appear blue to the human eye due to this scattering.

In 2017–2019, the primary hydrogen atmosphere with overall low metallicity, depleted methane and traces of water was characterized. It is likely filling an entire Roche lobe of the planet. In 2019 and 2020, a metastable helium outflow was detected in the atmosphere of Gliese 3470 b, indicating the atmosphere is currently escaping at rate 30,000-100,000 tons per second, or 0.16-0.53 Earth masses per billion years.

Gallery

See also 
KELT-9b
Gliese 3470
Kepler-51

References 

Exoplanets discovered in 2012
Exoplanets detected by radial velocity
6
Transiting exoplanets
Cancer (constellation)